Ptolemy Slocum (born 20 November 1975) is an American actor, known for his role as Sylvester in Westworld.

Slocum was born in the Kenyan capital Nairobi. He was named after the Greek astronomer Claudius Ptolemy and has been active as an actor since 2003. He first starred in several short films, before his first film appearance in 2005, portraying Ron in Hitch. As a result, he began to take on guest roles in numerous well-known US series, such as The Sopranos, The Wire, Fringe, Burn Notice, How I Met Your Mother, Criminal Minds, Emergence and others.

Slocum has taken on more recurring roles, such as in Looking and Preacher. Since 2016, he has played the role of Sylvester in the science fiction series Westworld.

Slocum is an alumnus of the George Washington University and college comedy group receSs.

Filmography

Film

Television

Video games

References

External links
 

People from Nairobi
21st-century American male actors
American people of Kenyan descent
Living people
1975 births